

	

Haines is a locality in the Australian state of South Australia located on the south coast of Kangaroo Island overlooking the body of water known in Australia as the Southern Ocean and by international authorities as the Great Australian Bight.

Its boundaries were created in March 2002 for the “long established name” which was derived from the cadastral unit of the Hundred of Haines.

The principal land use in the locality is primary production with land along the coastline and land occupied by the Beyeria Conservation Park being both zoned for conservation purposes.

Haines is located within the federal division of Mayo, the state electoral district of Mawson and the local government area of the Kangaroo Island Council.

See also
Haines (disambiguation)

References
Notes

Citations

Towns on Kangaroo Island